On the Rocks: A Political Comedy (1932) is a play by George Bernard Shaw which deals with the social crisis of the Great Depression. The entire play is set in the Cabinet Room of 10 Downing Street. It is noted for its evidence of Shaw's political evolution towards apparent support for dictatorship.

Context
The play was written in the midst of the Depression, and shortly after Hitler had come to power in Germany. The figure of the Prime Minister recalls that of Ramsay MacDonald, who was running the National Government at the time it was written. Shaw had recently given a lecture entitled "In Praise of Guy Fawkes" in which he had spoken very positively of British Fascist leader Oswald Mosley. Beatrice Webb described it as a "painfully incoherent tirade" in which "he said nothing in particular except for the laudation of Oswald Mosley as the 'man of the future'".  Webb later noted that Shaw's enthusiasm had abated after Mosley became associated more with Nazism than with Italian-style Fascism.

Plot
In the near future Britain is descending into social chaos as a result of economic collapse. The Liberal Prime minister, Sir Arthur Chavender, is having to find a way to deal with the problem. A national government has not worked. In the Cabinet Room the Prime Minister meets various advisers, members of his family, a mysterious female doctor, and deputations from the people. Chavender is described as a typical politician, who "could be trusted to talk and say nothing, to thump the table and do nothing". When the deputation representing the unemployed arrives, Chavender suavely dismisses them with empty promises, but finds himself disturbed by the resentment of the more perceptive delegates. A conversation with his wife further weakens his self-confidence.

Chavender meets with Old Hipney, a veteran of the Labour movement. Hipney says that parliament has had its day. Decisive leadership is needed. A female doctor arrives and tells him that he will die of mental enervation unless he changes. Chavender has a radical change of heart. Inspired by Stalin, he proposes to introduce wholesale nationalisation of industry and compulsory public service. He meets with members of the Labour and Conservative parties, who initially approve his plan, as does Sir Jafna Pandranath, a Sri Lankan millionaire who represents the business interests of the British Empire. Soon, however, negotiations break down, and Chavender says that a dictatorship is the only answer to stop the ineffective chatter and competing interests of the various factions. Dexter Rightside, the Conservative leader, is horrified and promises to provoke a counter-revolution should any such thing happen. The Labour figures are also appalled that the independence of Trades Unions will be lost. Pandranath, however, is in favour of the scheme, declaring democracy to be dead. Hipney states that we need a new Napoleon. Chavender agrees that such a man might be needed, but that he would hate the man for the brutality of the regime he would have to introduce to make it work. The mob of the unemployed then break into the room, smashing windows and singing "England arise!".

Politics
The politics of the play have been interpreted in various ways. Chavender appears to express distate for dictatorship while also believing it will be necessary. At one point he says that people "are ready to go mad with enthusiasm for any man strong enough to make them do anything, even if it is only Jew baiting, provided it's something tyrannical, something coercive, something that we all pretend no Englishman would submit to".  Margery Morgan argues that the Carlylean attacks on democracy articulated by Hipley define him as a Mephistophelian figure, trying to tempt Chavender, but that play presents the fascistic solution he proposes as unacceptable.  Gareth Griffith, however, argues that "the play's message is not as obviously salutatory as Morgan suggests", since it contains "an underlying commitment to ruthlessness in public life".

Preface
That commitment was fully expressed in the preface to the play, which is far less ambiguous, and begins with an explicit affirmation of "killing as a political function", at least of "untameable persons who are constitutionally unable to restrain their violent or acquisitive impulses". He then discusses large-scale political "exterminations":

Shaw says that there is nothing new in this, since the "extermination of what the exterminators call inferior races is as old as history." What is new is that modern politicians since the French revolution have created a social principle of extermination, whether it be of aristocrats as in the case of France, or Jews as in Germany. This is an outgrowth of class conflict, but in the future such decisions can be made scientifically.

References

1932 plays
Plays by George Bernard Shaw
Plays set in London
Great Depression plays